The Mar Qu, Ulan Moron (Ulaan Mörön, lit. "Red River") or Tuotuo River (Chinese: , p Tuótuó Hé, lit. "Tearful River") is a  long river, located  in Qinghai province in the People's Republic of China. Although the Dangqu (or Dam Chu) is the geographic source of the Yangtze River, the Ulan Moron has been traditionally regarded as the main river. With its location in Inner Asia, it therefore belongs to the East China Sea watershed basin.

It begins as melt-off from the Geladandong glaciers and runs to a confluence with the Dangqu, where they form the Tongtian River.

In Chinese, the character  originally described the Yellow River and  the Yangtze. In modern practice, a jiang is usually a longer river, while he varies from shorter rivers (as the Tuotuo) to creeks (such as Suzhou Creek in Shanghai).

See also
Yangtze River
List of rivers in China

References

Rivers of Qinghai
Tributaries of the Yangtze River